Ranzi may refer to:

Ranzi (surname)
Ranzi is a small old town close to Pietra Ligure in the north of Italy.
Ranzi is also a town in the Niari Region in the Republic of Congo.
The Arabic name for Tokimeki Tonight series